Sharpe's Mission is a British television drama, the 11th of a series that follows the career of Richard Sharpe, a British soldier during the Napoleonic Wars. Unlike most of the other installments of the series, this episode was not based on a novel by Bernard Cornwell.

Plot summary
After a prologue set in 1810, which introduces Major Brand (Mark Strong), a British officer serving with Richard Sharpe (Sean Bean), the plot fast-forwards to present-day 1813, where France is losing the war. Major Sharpe is teamed with Brand, now a Colonel renowned for leading a small band of soldiers operating far behind enemy lines. Wellington (Hugh Fraser) assigns them the task of blowing up a store of gunpowder vital to French General Calvet (Olivier Pierre). To do this, they need the expertise of explosives expert Major Pyecroft (Nigel Betts). Major General Ross (James Laurenson), Wellington's head of military intelligence, will accompany them to evaluate Calvet's intentions.

Meanwhile, a Gypsy family stumbles upon a secret meeting between a French colonel and a masked Colonel Brand, with one of his men. The interrupted plotters pursue and kill the Gypsies, except for a young woman, Zara (Berrin Politi), who manages to hide. Afterwards, she starts to bury her dead parents, only to flee when another masked man appears. However, it turns out to be Pyecroft, whose face was disfigured by a bomb accident. He digs the graves and takes Zara under his protection.

In the British encampment, Zara spots one of her family's horses and tells Pyecroft that the murderers spoke English; next day three gypsies, with whom Zara was to have stayed, are found garrotted. Sharpe's suspicions are aroused by the unexplained deaths and Brand's assumption that 'Pyecroft's gypsy' was among them.

As their joint mission unfolds, Sharpe realizes Brand is a traitor and French spy, luring them in order to trap Ross for his knowledge of Wellington's plans.

Forewarned, Sharpe is able to turn the tables on the turncoat. After Sharpe's men capture the fort where the gunpowder is stored, he has Ross convene a court-martial, in which Brand is convicted and sentenced to death. Fearing that Brand's influential friends may be able to overturn the verdict, Sharpe conducts an impromptu execution by pushing the traitor into a deep well. The British blow up the gunpowder and escape, while Brand's men are given the opportunity to redeem themselves by acting as a rearguard to hold off the attacking French forces.

However all is not well for Sharpe. His wife Jane (Abigail Cruttenden) is becoming more and more dissatisfied with his career as a soldier. Nonetheless, a would-be seducer (journalist Shellington) is foiled by Harris, acting as manservant. Pyecroft and Zara become engaged.

Cast
 Sean Bean – Major Richard Sharpe
 Daragh O'Malley – Sergeant Major Patrick Harper
 Abigail Cruttenden – Jane Gibbons
 Hugh Fraser – Lord Wellington
 James Laurenson – Major General Ross
 Mark Strong – Colonel Brand
 Andrew Schofield – Pope
 Nigel Betts – Major Septimus Pyecroft
 Warren Saire – Shellington
 John Tams – Rifleman Daniel Hagman
 Jason Salkey – Rifleman Harris
 Diana Perez – Ramona
 Peter Le Campion – Colonel Cresson
 Olivier Pierre – General Calvet
 Christian Rodska – Crake
 Berrin Politi – Zara
 Michael Mallinson – Provost Marshal
 Aysun Metiner – Conchita

External links
 
 Sharpe's Mission at SharpeFilm.com 

1996 British television episodes
1990s historical films
1990s war films
Napoleonic Wars films
Mission
War television films
Cultural depictions of Arthur Wellesley, 1st Duke of Wellington
Fiction set in 1810
Fiction set in 1813
Films directed by Tom Clegg (director)